Young Sheldon is an American coming-of-age sitcom television series created by Chuck Lorre and Steven Molaro for CBS. The series, taking place in the late 1980s and early 1990s, is a spin-off prequel to The Big Bang Theory and begins with the character Sheldon Cooper at the age of nine, living with his family in East Texas and going to high school. Iain Armitage stars as the title character. Jim Parsons, who portrayed the adult Sheldon Cooper on The Big Bang Theory, narrates the series and serves as an executive producer. In March 2021, CBS renewed the series for a fifth, sixth, and seventh season.

 The sixth season premiered on September 29, 2022.

Series overview

Episodes

Season 1 (2017–18)

Season 2 (2018–19)

Season 3 (2019–20)

Season 4 (2020–21)

Season 5 (2021–22)

Season 6 (2022–23)

Ratings

Season 1

Season 2

Season 3

Season 4

Season 5

Season 6

References

External links 
 
 

Lists of American sitcom episodes